Centara Grand at Central Plaza Ladprao Bangkok is a 607-room hotel in Bangkok, Thailand adjacent to CentralPlaza Lardprao.

It opened in 1982 as the 2Hyatt Central Plaza Bangkok. It was later managed by Central Hotel & Resorts, then rebranded to Sofitel Centara Grand Bangkok. In 2011, Accor, parent company of Sofitel, did not renew their management contract with Centara Hotels & Resorts, which owns the hotel and they assumed direct management. Nearby is a large convention center.

References

Hotels in Bangkok
Hotels established in 1982
Hotel buildings completed in 1982
1982 establishments in Thailand
Central Group